Shapour Bakhtiar (26 June 19146 August 1991) was an Iranian politician who served as the last Prime Minister of Iran under the Mohammad Reza Shah Pahlavi. In the words of historian Abbas Milani: "more than once in the tone of a jeremiad he reminded the nation of the dangers of clerical despotism, and of how the fascism of the mullahs would be darker than any military junta". In 1991, he and his secretary were murdered in his home in Suresnes, France, by agents of the Islamic Republic.

Early life
Bakhtiar was born on 26 June 1914 in southwestern Iran into a family of Iranian tribal nobility, the family of the paramount chieftains of the then powerful Bakhtiari tribe. His father was Mohammad Reza Khan (Sardar-e-Fateh). His mother was Naz-Baygom, and both of his parents were Lurs and Bakhtiaris. Bakhtiar's maternal grandfather, Najaf-Gholi Khan Samsam ol-Saltaneh, had been appointed prime minister twice, in 1912 and 1918.

Bakhtiar's mother died when he was seven years old. His father was executed by Reza Shah in 1934 while Shapour was studying in Paris.

Education
He attended elementary school in Shahr-e Kord and then secondary school, first in Isfahan and later in Beirut, where he received his high school diploma from a French school. He attended Beirut University for two years. He and his cousin, Teymour Bakhtiar, then went to Paris for additional university education at the Faculty of Law. There, he attended the College of Political Science.

Being a firm opponent of totalitarian rule, he was active in the Spanish Civil War for the Second Spanish Republic against General Francisco Franco's fascism. In 1940, he volunteered for the French army– rather than the French Foreign Legion– and fought in the 30th Artillerie Regiment of Orléans. According to MEED, Bakhtiar did 18 months' military service. While living in Saint-Nicolas-du-Pélem, he fought with the French Resistance against the German occupation. In 1945, he received his PhD in political science as well as degrees in law from the Faculty of Law of Paris and philosophy from the Sorbonne.

Political career

Bakhtiar returned to Iran in 1946 and joined the social democratic Iran Party in 1949 and led its youth organization. In 1951 he was appointed director of the labor department in the Province of Isfahan by the ministry of labor. He later held the same position in Khuzestan, center of the oil industry. In 1951 Mohammad Mosaddeq had come to power in Iran. Under his premiership Bakhtiar was appointed deputy minister of labor in 1953. After the Shah was reinstated by a British-American sponsored coup d'état, Bakhtiar remained a critic of his rule.

In the mid-1950s he was involved in underground activity against the Shah's regime, calling for the 1954 Majlis elections to be free and fair and attempting to revive the nationalist movement. In 1960, the Second National Front was formed and Bakhtiar played a crucial role in the new organization's activities as the head of the student activist body of the Front. He and his colleagues differed from most other government opponents in that they were very moderate, restricting their activity to peaceful protest and calling only for the restoration of democratic rights within the framework of a constitutional monarchy. The Shah refused to co-operate and outlawed the Front and imprisoned the most prominent liberals. From 1964 to 1977, the imperial regime refused to permit any form of opposition activity, even from moderate liberals like Bakhtiar. In the following years Bakhtiar was imprisoned repeatedly, a total of six years, for his opposition to the Shah. He was also one of the prominent members of central council of the illegal Fourth National Front in late 1977, when the group was reconstituted as the Union of National Front Forces with Bakhtiar as head of the Iran Party (the largest group in the Front).

At the end of 1978 (as the Shah's power was crumbling), Bakhtiar was chosen to help in the creation of a civilian government to replace the existing military one. He was appointed to the position of Prime Minister by the Shah, as a concession to his opponents, especially the followers of the Ayatollah Ruhollah Khomeini. Although that caused him to be expelled from the National Front, he accepted the appointment, as he feared a revolution in which communists and mullahs would take over the country, which he thought would ruin Iran.

In his 36 days as premier of Iran, Bakhtiar ordered all political prisoners to be freed, lifted censorship of newspapers (whose staff had until then been on strike), relaxed martial law, ordered the dissolution of SAVAK (the regime's secret police) and requested for the opposition to give him three months to hold elections for a constituent assembly that would decide the fate of the monarchy and determine the future form of government for Iran. Despite the conciliatory gestures, Khomeini refused to collaborate with Bakhtiar, denouncing the premier as a traitor for siding with the Shah, labeling his government "illegitimate" and "illegal" and calling for the overthrow of the monarchy. Bakhtiar was accused by some of making mistakes during his premiership such as allowing Khomeini to re-enter Iran. In the end, he failed to rally even his own former colleagues of the National Front.

His government was overwhelmingly rejected by the masses except for a very small number of pro-Shah loyalists and a handful of moderate pro-democratic elements. The opposition was not willing to compromise. The Shah was forced to leave the country in January 1979; Bakhtiar left Iran again for France in April of the same year.

French exile and series of assassination attempts
Shortly after the revolution, Ayatollah Sadegh Khalkhali, a religious judge and later chairman of the Revolutionary Court, announced to the press that the death sentence had been passed on members of the Pahlavi family and former Shah officials, including Bakhtiar.

In July 1979, Bakhtiar emerged in Paris. He was given political asylum there. From his base in Paris, he led the National Movement of Iranian Resistance, which fought the Islamic Republic from within the country. Between 9 and 10 July 1980, Bakhtiar helped organize a coup attempt known as the Nojeh coup plot, prompting the Islamic Republic to issue a death sentence on him.

On 18 July 1980, he escaped an assassination attempt by a group of three attackers in his home in Neuilly-sur-Seine, a suburb of Paris, in which a policeman and a neighbor were killed. The five-man assassination team with ties to the newly formed Islamic republic led by Anis Naccache, a Lebanese, was captured. They were given life sentences, but French President François Mitterrand pardoned them in July 1990. They were sent to Tehran.

Assassination

On 6 August 1991, Bakhtiar was murdered along with his secretary, Soroush Katibeh, by three assassins in his home in the Parisian suburb of Suresnes. Both men were killed with kitchen knives. Their bodies were not found until at least 36 hours after death, even though Bakhtiar had heavy police protection and his killers had left identity documents with a guard at his house. Two of the assassins escaped to Iran. A third, Ali Vakili Rad, was apprehended in Switzerland, along with an alleged accomplice, Zeynalabedin Sarhadi, a great-nephew of the president of Iran at the time, Hashemi Rafsanjani. Both were extradited to France for trial. Vakili Rad was sentenced to life in prison in December 1994, but Sarhadi was acquitted. Rad was paroled on 19 May 2010, after serving 16 years of his sentence. He was received as a hero by Islamic Republic officials.

Aftermath
The release of Rad had happened only two days after Tehran freed Clotilde Reiss, a French student accused of spying by the Islamic regime. Both the French and Iranian governments deny the two affairs are linked.

Hours after the assassination of Bakhtiar, a British hostage was released from Lebanon, presumably held by Hezbollah, but a French hostage was taken. Although many in the Iranian exile community speculated of official French complicity in Bakhtiar's death, the second kidnapping is said to cast a shadow over such theories. The French would seem unlikely to support an operation that included the kidnapping of another French hostage in Lebanon, but there is no apparent connection between the two events.

Published works
He published a memoir in addition to many articles. Bakhtiar's books include Ma Fidélité (in French) and 37 Days after 37 Years (in Persian), his biography (highlighting his political career and his beliefs, up to the Iranian Revolution). His writings are of special interest regarding society and politics in the Pahlavi Era and the period of riots and turbulence just before the fall of Mohammad Reza Shah Pahlavi.

Personal life
Bakhtiar was first married to a French woman with whom he had three children, a son Guy and two daughters, Viviane and France. Viviane died of a heart attack at the age of 49 in Cannes in August 1991. Guy is a French police intelligence unit officer.

Shortly before his death, Bakhtiar divorced his wife and married a young Iranian woman. His second wife was Shahintaj, and they had a son, Goudarz. He also had a stepdaughter named Manijeh Assad. As of 2001, all three were United States citizens.

Bakhtiar is buried in Montparnasse Cemetery in Paris.

See also
List of people involved with the French Resistance

Notes

External links

Website dedicated to Bakhtiar: (English), (Persian).
Interview with Bakhtiar on Tuesday 6 March 1984 in Paris (in Persian):Shapour Bakhtiar, Iranian Oral History, Harvard University Center for Middle Eastern Studies:— Audio 1a (29 min 30 sec), Audio 2a (30 min 35 sec), Audio 1b (29 min 18 sec), Audio 2b (30 min 44 sec)
Iran Chamber Society—Historic Personalities: Shapour Bakhtiar
Persian Iran page about Bakhtiar
Detail audio report about Dr. Bakhtiar's Murder by the Qods Force 

1914 births
1991 deaths
People from Khuzestan Province
Lur people
Bakhtiari people
National Front (Iran) politicians
Prime Ministers of Iran
Iranian democracy activists
People of the Iranian Revolution
French Army soldiers
Exiles of the Iranian Revolution in France
Iranian emigrants to France
University of Paris alumni
1991 murders in France
Assassinated Iranian politicians
Iranian people murdered abroad
People murdered in Paris
Terrorism deaths in France
Deaths by stabbing in France
Burials at Montparnasse Cemetery
French Army personnel of World War II
French Resistance members
People of the Spanish Civil War
Iran Party politicians
National Resistance Movement of Iran politicians
People with acquired French citizenship
20th-century Iranian politicians
People from Chaharmahal and Bakhtiari Province
1990s murders in Paris